Amrutha Iyengar is an Indian actress who works mainly in Kannada film industry. She is known for her lead roles in Love Mocktail and Popcorn Monkey Tiger in 2020.

Career
Amrutha made her acting debut through the 2017 movie Simha Hakida Hejje directed by Vikram Kumar. She did another movie Anushka and received mixed response. She starred in Love Mocktail and Popcorn Monkey Tiger, both of which were successful.

Filmography

Accolades

References

External links
 

Actresses in Kannada cinema
Living people
Actresses from Mysore
1996 births